Aurel Neagu (born 8 July 1954) is a Romanian wrestler. He competed in the men's freestyle 57 kg at the 1980 Summer Olympics.

References

1954 births
Living people
Romanian male sport wrestlers
Olympic wrestlers of Romania
Wrestlers at the 1980 Summer Olympics
People from Tulcea County
Universiade bronze medalists for Romania
Universiade medalists in wrestling